Site 41, also known as Lesobaza and SK-1, was a launch complex at the Plesetsk Cosmodrome in Russia. It consisted of a single pad, Site 41/1, and was used by R-7 derived rockets between 1959 and 1989.

Site 41 was originally built for use by R-7A Semyorka missiles. During the Cuban Missile Crisis, an armed missile was placed on Site 41. It would have had a response time of 8–12 hours should an order have been given to launch it. No launches were conducted from Site 41 whilst it was operational.

In 1963, the complex was converted for use by carrier rockets. The first launch from the complex was a suborbital test of an R-7A Semyorka missile, on 14 December 1965. The first orbital launch from the complex occurred on 17 March 1966, when a Vostok-2 rocket launched Kosmos 112. In total, 308 orbital and two suborbital launches were conducted from the complex, using R-7A, Vostok-2, Vostok-2M, Voskhod and Soyuz-U rockets. The last launch to use the complex was of a Soyuz-U with Bion 9 on 15 September 1989. Since this launch, the pad has been disassembled.

References

Plesetsk Cosmodrome